Toilers of the Sea is a 1936 British historical drama film directed by Ted Fox and Selwyn Jepson and starring Mary Lawson, Cyril McLaglen and Andrews Engelmann.

It is an adaptation of the novel of the same title by Victor Hugo. It was made at Wembley Studios.

Cast
 Mary Lawson as Deruchette
 Cyril McLaglen as Gilliatt
 Andrews Engelmann as Capt. Clubin
 Wilson Coleman as Lethierry
 Ian Colin as Peter Caudray
 William Dewhurst as Landois
 Walter Sondes as Rataine

References

Bibliography
 Low, Rachael. Filmmaking in 1930s Britain. George Allen & Unwin, 1985.
 Wood, Linda. British Films, 1927-1939. British Film Institute, 1986.

External links

1936 films
British drama films
1936 drama films
British black-and-white films
Films shot at Wembley Studios
Columbia Pictures films
1930s English-language films
1930s British films